Paganur  is a village in the Srirangam taluk of Tiruchirappalli district in Tamil Nadu, India. It is part of Manikandam block.

Demographics 

As per the 2001 census, Paganur had a population of 1,999 with 972 males and 1,027 females. The sex ratio was 1057 and the literacy rate, 66.97.

References 

 

Villages in Tiruchirappalli district